The Boston Storm was a professional inline hockey team based in Boston, Massachusetts, United States. It was a member of Major League Roller Hockey. The Boston Storm played its first season in 2003-2004 after the owner and general manager, Marty Marcinczyk, moved the team from Virginia after two seasons. It was led by All-Star forwards Tony Silvestri, Brett Wickman, Joe Brennan, Rodney Millette, and Jeff Goulet and backed by defense from Eric Sarao and Darrell Interbartolo. The team won the MLRH World Championship title in 2006. Part of the rebirth of MLRH, the Storm was one of six teams announced for the 2008 MLRH Pro Tour.

The MLRH website no longer shows the Boston Storm as a team. However, the site does show the team winning the World Championship in 2006 before ultimately signing with Professional Inline Hockey Association.

References

External links
2003-2004 season
MLRH website
Tony Sylvestri
Brett Wickman
Rodney Millette
Jeff Goulet
Eric Sarao 
Roster

2001 establishments in Massachusetts
Defunct sports teams in Massachusetts
Major League Roller Hockey
Sports clubs established in 2001
Storm